Jay Rhys Dasilva (born 22 April 1998) is an English professional footballer who plays as a defender for  club Bristol City and the England national under-21 team.

Club career

Chelsea
Dasilva joined Chelsea from Luton Town in 2012, aged just thirteen, and was quickly integrated into the club's youth setup, making his under-18 debut as an under-15 the following year. The following season, he made 23 appearances for the youth team, including scoring in the 2013–14 FA Youth Cup final first leg against Fulham.

During his second full season with the under-18s, Dasilva won the 2014–15 FA Youth Cup, as well as the 2014–15 UEFA Youth League, playing all but one game in the UEFA Youth League. He signed his first professional contract in July 2015, having forced himself into Chelsea's under-21 side, where he established himself as a key player over the next year. He became one of the only players in history to win three FA Youth Cups, alongside teammate Jake Clarke-Salter and five of the famed Busby Babes, when he was part of the Chelsea side that lifted the 2015–16 FA Youth Cup. He was also a member of the Chelsea side that claimed the 2015–16 UEFA Youth League, however he was an unused substitute in the final victory against PSG.

Charlton Athletic (loan)
On 30 December 2016, Dasilva was loaned to League One side Charlton Athletic. He made his debut for The Addicks on 14 January 2017, coming on as a substitute for Lewis Page against Millwall. He was brought on in the 28th minute, but was later substituted in the 80th minute of the game. On 4 April 2017, Dasilva was given his first start for Charlton by manager Karl Robinson, in their 2–0 home defeat against Milton Keynes Dons, featuring for the entire 90 minutes.

On 21 July 2017, Dasilva signed a new contract with Chelsea until 2021 and rejoined Charlton Athletic for a second loan spell.

On 7 May 2018, Dasilva was voted the 2017–18 Fans Player of the Year.

Bristol City
On 9 August 2018, Dasilva joined Bristol City on a season long loan from Chelsea. He signed for Bristol City permanently on 26 June 2019 on a four-year contract for an undisclosed fee. He scored his first goal for Bristol City, and his first professional goal, in a 2–1 win against Huddersfield Town on 3 November 2020.

International career
Dasilva has represented England at under-16, under-17, under-18, under-19, under-20 and under-21 youth levels.

He was called up to the England under-16 team shortly after joining Chelsea's youth ranks for a Victory Shield game against Scotland. He made 4 appearances in total at this age level.

He was later called up to the England under-17 team for 2015 UEFA European Under-17 Championship qualification in 2014. He scored his first and only goal at this age group, described as a 'brilliant solo effort', in a 3–1 victory over France. He maintained his place in the squad for the full tournament, and played in every game as England were knocked out by eventual semi-finalists Russia. His last match for the under-17s came in a 0–0 draw with South Korea at the 2015 FIFA U-17 World Cup.

In March 2017, Dasilva was called up to the England under-19 team for 2017 UEFA European Under-19 Championship qualification. In July 2017, Dasilva captained the England under-19 team to victory at the 2017 UEFA European Under-19 Championship.

On 27 May 2019, Dasilva was included in England's 23-man squad for the 2019 UEFA European Under-21 Championship.

Career statistics

Honours
Chelsea Reserves
FA Youth Cup: 2013–14, 2014–15, 2015–16
UEFA Youth League: 2014–15, 2015–16

England U19
UEFA European Under-19 Championship: 2017

England U21
Toulon Tournament: 2018

Individual
Charlton Athletic Fans' Player of the Year: 2017–18

Personal life
Jay Dasilva is the brother of twins who are also footballers; Cole Dasilva and Rio Dasilva. He is of Welsh and Brazilian descent.

References

External links
Jay Dasilva profile at the Football Association website

1998 births
Living people
Footballers from Luton
English footballers
England youth international footballers
England under-21 international footballers
English people of Welsh descent
English people of Brazilian descent
Association football defenders
Chelsea F.C. players
Charlton Athletic F.C. players
Bristol City F.C. players
English Football League players